Palatnik is a Bulgarian surname, derived from the word palatka,  "tent". It may refer to:

 Abraham Palatnik (born 1902), doctor specialized in radiology, born in Lipkani, Russia
 Abraham Palatnik (born 1928), Brazilian artist and inventor
 Leo Palatnik (1909–1994), Ukrainian physicist
 Lori Palatnik (born 1960), Orthodox Jewish educator, author and video blogger
 Sam Palatnik (born 1950), Ukrainian-US Jewish chess Grandmaster

See also
 

Russian-language surnames
Ukrainian-language surnames
Jewish surnames